Cory Larose (born May 14, 1975) is a Canadian former professional ice hockey player who played seven games in the National Hockey League (NHL) for the New York Rangers during the 2003–04 season. Larose played most of his career in the North American minor professional leagues and European leagues.

Larose was born in Campbellton, New Brunswick. Larose played junior hockey in British Columbia for the Langley Thunder. After two years with the Thunder, Larose entered the University of Maine. He played four seasons with Maine's Black Bears. After graduation, Larose signed with the Minnesota Wild as a free agent.

Larose played his first professional season in 2000–01 with the Cleveland Lumberjacks and the Jackson Bandits. He moved up to the Houston Aeros of the American Hockey League (AHL) for the 2001–02 season, and played part of the 2002–03 season when he was traded to the New York Rangers organization, joining the Hartford Wolfpack in February 2003. He played one further season in the Rangers' organization, including a seven-game call-up to the Rangers.

In 2004, he signed as a free agent with the Atlanta Thrashers. He played one season for the Thrashers' affiliate Chicago Wolves in the AHL, before playing a season with Langnau Tigers. In 2006, he attended the Thrashers training camp and was assigned again to Chicago. After a season with Chicago, Larose played another season in Europe, returning in 2008 to play for the San Jose Sharks' AHL affiliate Worcester Sharks. Larose then finished his career in Europe, playing until 2011.

Career statistics

Trades
 May 11, 2000 – signed by the Minnesota Wild as a free agent.
 February 20, 2003 – traded to the New York Rangers for Jay Henderson.
 July 14, 2004 – signed by the Atlanta Thrashers as a free agent.
 May 23, 2007 – signed with Ak Bars as a free agent
 October 8, 2007 – signed with Luleå Hockey from Ak Bars.
July 15, 2008 – signed by the San Jose Sharks as a free agent.

Awards and honours

References

External links

1975 births
Ak Bars Kazan players
Canadian ice hockey centres
Chicago Wolves players
Cleveland Lumberjacks players
Hartford Wolf Pack players
Houston Aeros (1994–2013) players
Ice hockey people from New Brunswick
Jackson Bandits players
Living people
Luleå HF players
Maine Black Bears men's ice hockey players
New York Rangers players
People from Campbellton, New Brunswick
SC Langenthal players
SCL Tigers players
Undrafted National Hockey League players
Vienna Capitals players
Worcester Sharks players
Canadian expatriate ice hockey players in Sweden
AHCA Division I men's ice hockey All-Americans
NCAA men's ice hockey national champions